A Jech–Kunen tree is a set-theoretic tree with properties that are incompatible with the generalized continuum hypothesis. It is named after Thomas Jech and Kenneth Kunen, both of whom studied the possibility and consequences of its existence.

Definition

Existence

References

Trees (set theory)
Independence results